The PKP class TKt48 was a class of freight tank (TK) 2-8-2 (t) steam locomotive of  the Polish State Railways (PKP). Originally intended for use in suburban traffic, the locomotives were later mainly used for passenger and freight trains on the low mountain range in southern Poland. Six locomotives were sold to Albania.

The locomotive was designed in the central Polish design office in Poznan from 1948. The basis of the construction were never implemented plans for a series 83 of the DR, which came from the Linke-Hofmann-Werke in Breslau. In the years 1950–57, over 200 locomotives were supplied by the Polish locomotive factories Cegielski and Fablok, 191 of which were delivered to PKP.

The locomotives proved to be unsuitable for their original application in fast suburban traffic because of their rather low power. Thanks to the relatively high frictional mass, however, the locomotives were ideal for operation on the low mountain range. On the routes in the Giant Mountains and in the foothills of the High Tatras, the locomotives proved themselves as real universal locomotives. In addition, due to the top speed of 80 km / h in both directions of travel, these machines do not have to be turned - a major advantage when they are used on secondary routes.

The locomotives were still in scheduled use in large numbers until the end of the 1980s. It was only when most of the branch lines in Poland were closed in 1989 that the locomotives were no longer used. Most of them were decommissioned and scrapped but many survived into preservation and were restored to operational condition.

Albania

The Albanian railway Hekurudha Shqiptare had acquired six new locomotives in the late 1950s. The "avullore" were in use until 1986 with a last special run in 1991. At first they pulled passenger and freight trains on the Durrës – Peqin line, Albania's first railway line. They were later used in the port of Durrës and at the Shkozet depot for shunting freight wagons. [1]

Preservation
The following locomotives have been preserved:

TKt48-191 in the Museum of Vehicles and Railway Technology in Chabówka as an operational museum locomotive
TKt48-188 in Saint-Sulpice (Switzerland) as an operational museum locomotive
TKt48-147, TKt48-143 in the Wolsztyn steam plant (currently not operational)
TKt48-177 as a monument locomotive in Nowy Sącz
TKt48-53 as a monument locomotive in Iława
TKt48-18 (as an operational museum locomotive), TKt48–67, TKt48–100, TKt48–173 in Jaworzyna Śląska
TKt48-102 in Jasło
TKt48-58 as a monument locomotive in Jelenia Góra
TKt48-119 as a monument locomotive in Wałbrzych
TKt48-29 as a monument locomotive in Szczecin Główny
TKt48-146 as the club's own (KSK) locomotive in Breslau, intended for operational refurbishment
TKt48 2923-02 as an exhibition object in Tirana, Albania
TKt48-87 in CVF3V (Mariembourg - Treignes), Belgium. Operational.

References

TKt48
Standard gauge locomotives of Poland
Railway locomotives introduced in 1950
2-8-2T locomotives
Steam locomotives of Albania
Standard gauge locomotives of Albania